Thirlmere is a former railway station which was located on the Picton – Mittagong loop railway line. It served Thirlmere, a small town in the Macarthur Region of New South Wales, Australia.

History
The station opened on 1 August 1885 as Redbank and was renamed Thirlmere in 1886. The station, along with the Loop Line, was closed in 1978.

The station buildings have been restored by volunteers from the NSW Rail Museum in Thirlmere.

Every weekend the NSW Rail Museum operates four return heritage steam or diesel train services between Thirlmere and Buxton with special events operating heritage services between Sydney Central Station, Picton, Thirlmere, and Buxton.

Image gallery

References

Disused regional railway stations in New South Wales
Railway stations in Australia opened in 1885
Railway stations closed in 1978
Main Southern railway line, New South Wales